Matrimonial Agency (French: Agence matrimoniale) is a 1952 French comedy drama film directed by Jean-Paul Le Chanois, written by Jean-Paul Le Chanois, and starring Bernard Blier and Louis de Funès.

The film's sets were designed by the art director Max Douy.

Plot
An average man inherits a marriage agency. He isn't prepared in any way to deal with this situation but step by step he lives up to the expectations.

Partial cast 
Bernard Blier as Noël Pailleret (the modest bank clerk)
Louis de Funès as Monsieur Charles
Michèle Alfa as Gilberte Jolivet
Julien Carette as Jérôme
Jean-Pierre Grenier as Jacques
Yolande Laffon as Madame Pailleret (Noël's mother)
Anne Campion as Viviane Galey
Marcelle Praince as Madame Martin
Pierre Mondy as The client

References

Bibliography
 Dayna Oscherwitz & MaryEllen Higgins. The A to Z of French Cinema. Scarecrow Press, 2009.

External links 
 
 Agence matrimoniale (1952) at the Films de France

1952 films
French comedy-drama films
1952 comedy-drama films
1950s French-language films
French black-and-white films
Films directed by Jean-Paul Le Chanois
Films scored by Joseph Kosma
1950s French films